White Fungus is an art magazine and project based in Taichung City, Taiwan. Founded by brothers Ron and Mark Hanson in Wellington, New Zealand, in 2004, as a quasi-political manifesto, copies of the first issue were produced on a photocopier, wrapped in Christmas paper and hurled anonymously through the entrances of businesses throughout the city. Now a magazine featuring interviews, writing on art, new music, history and politics, White Fungus takes a dialogical approach to the work it covers. The name of the publication comes from a can of “white fungus” the Hansons found in their local supermarket in the industrial zone of Taichung City. Each cover of White Fungus is derived from a scan of the can.

White Fungus has held interdisciplinary art events at galleries and venues including P.P.O.W. (New York), Kadist Art Foundation (San Francisco), N.K. (Berlin), The Lab (San Francisco), SOUP (Tokyo), Zajia Lab (Beijing), XXX (Hong Kong), Taipei Contemporary Art Center, the Cube (Taipei), Treasure Hill (Taipei), VT Artsalon (Taipei), ARTSPACE (Auckland), Waikato Museum (Hamilton), Adam Art Gallery (Wellington), Enjoy Public Gallery(Wellington), and The Physics Room(Christchurch). The publication is held in library collections including The Museum of Modern Art (New York), The New York Public Library (Art & Architecture Collection), The Southbank Centre (London), Museu d’Art Contemporani de Barcelona, Taipei Fine Art Museum, School of the Art Institute of Chicago, National Library of Australia and Te Papa Tongarewa (National Museum of New Zealand). The magazine has included articles by notable New Zealand art writers and artists, including Tao Wells.

White Fungus was part of the exhibition Millennium Magazines at the Museum of Modern Art in New York in 2012. The exhibition was a survey of magazines made by contemporary artists since 2000. In November 2012, White Fungus founders Ron Hanson and Mark Hanson gave a talk about the history of White Fungus at Times Museum in Guangzhou, China. In 2013 White Fungus was the magazine in residence at Kadist Art Foundation in San Francisco. While in the Bay Area, White Fungus released its 13th issue with events at Kadist and the Lab. The issue includes an article entitled 'The First Woman on Mars', written by American writer and independent scholar Ron Drummond. In late 2013 White Fungus signed a worldwide distribution deal with WhiteCirc in London.

References 
 Interview by Paul Holdengräber, Quarantine Tapes
 Interview by Jim Mora, Radion New Zealand
 Stack Magazines Interview
 Interview by Steven Heller, The Daily Heller
 MagCulture Interview
 Vice Magazine interview
 A Growing Manifesto - Interview on Baron Magazine
  Interview on Monocle Radio's The Stack
  Interview on ICRT
  Some Cool Zines You Should Know About - Complex Magazine
 "Eating White Fungus", HYPERALLERGIC
 "Spores of Knowledge", The Wire
 Interview on We Taipei Ren
 Interview in The Critic
 Interview on Arts on Sunday - Radio New Zealand
 Interview Sly on the Wall
 Review on Partial Durations
 Review on EyeContact
 Crazy Dream To Pursue: White Fungus For The Masses, profile of the Taiwan-based founders.
 Profile of White Fungus #12 on Self Publish, Be Happy.
 White Fungus interview on The End of Being
 White Fungus to go Global - Art Radar Asia
 Podcasts of Ron Hanson appearances on Upbeat with Eva Radich - Radio New Zealand
 A Quick Word with Ron Hanson - Idealog
 Kiwi Mag on an International Roll - Idealog
 NZ mag White Fungus Picked to Feature at MoMA - Idealog
 Fungus Mag wins place at MoMA - Dominion Post
 - Interview with Bryan Crump - Radio New Zealand
 Springing-Up-White-Fungus-Comes-to-Nelson - White Fungus comes to Nelson - Nelson Mail
 Review on Ol' Chanty
 An arts mag from New Zealand - with universal appeal - Tokafi
 Review on Harsmedia
 Interview with editor Ron Hanson on 'Kim Hill'
 White Fungus on World TV
 Art Mag Set For New York Exhibit
 Review on The Lumiere Reader
 Review on Print Fetish

External links
 White Fungus Magazine
 White Fungus at Kadist Art Foundation

2004 establishments in Taiwan
Visual arts magazines
Magazines established in 2004
Mass media in Taichung
Magazines published in Taiwan
Biannual magazines